Radio Dharan 88.8mhz is a radio station in Nepal, based in Dharan, Sunsari District.

References

External links

Radio stations in Nepal